Kaija Kärkinen (born 9 September 1962) is a Finnish singer and actress. She represented Finland in the Eurovision Song Contest 1991, with the song "Hullu yö", finishing 20th.

Kärkinen was born in Sodankylä. She started her career in the group Lato as a vocalist. After her Eurovision appearance, she started working as a duo with Finnish musician and guitarist Ile Kallio, releasing a number of albums.

Discography

Albums
1991: Mustaa vettä 
1995: Sade 
1996: Lupaus 
1997: Suuri salaisuus 
1999: Noitavoimaa 
2000: Kaikki oikeudet 
2002: Kymmenen laulua
2004: Kuka saa kyyneleet
2005: Sodassa ja rakkaudessa
2008: Saman taivaan alla 
2012: Köyhän naisen paratiisi

External links 

1962 births
Living people
People from Sodankylä
Eurovision Song Contest entrants of 1991
Eurovision Song Contest entrants for Finland
21st-century Finnish women singers
20th-century Finnish women singers